I Need may refer to:

 "I Need" (Kandi Burruss song)
 "I Need" (Maverick Sabre song)
 "I Need" (Meredith Brooks song)